This is a survey of the postage stamps and postal history of Tasmania (originally known as Van Diemen's Land), a former British colony that is now part of Australia.

First stamps
The first stamps of Van Diemen's Land were issued on 1 November 1853.

The colony was renamed in 1852 but until old stamp supplies were used up the Van Diemens Land stamps were used. The first stamps inscribed Tasmania were issued in January 1858. 

Until 1896, all postage stamps portrayed Queen Victoria. In 1899, a pictorial set was issued and was reprinted several times until 1912. 

Tasmania's last issue was in 1913 and was superseded by those of Australia.

Postal fiscals
Between 1882 and 1900, revenue stamps of 1863 to 1900 were valid for postage. These postal fiscals remained in use unofficially until 1903.

Gallery

See also
Postage stamps and postal history of Australia
Revenue stamps of Tasmania

References

Further reading
Tinsley, Walton Eugene. Stamps & postal history of Tasmania. London: Royal Philatelic Society London, 1986.

External links
Tasmanian Philatelic Society

History of Tasmania
Philately of Australia
Postal history of Australia
Postage stamps of Australia